Marcel Aymé (29 March 1902 – 14 October 1967) was a French novelist and playwright, who also wrote screenplays and works for children.

Biography  
Marcel André Aymé was born in Joigny, in the Burgundy region of France, the youngest of six children. His father, Joseph, was a blacksmith, and his mother, Emma Monamy, died when he was two years old, after the family had moved to Tours. Marcel was sent to live with his maternal grandparents in the village of Villers-Robert, a place where he would spend the next eight years, and which would serve as the model for the fictitious village of Claquebue in what is perhaps the most well-known of his novels, La Jument verte. In 1906 Marcel entered the local primary school. Because his grandfather was a staunch anti-clerical republican, he was looked down upon by his classmates, many of whose parents held more traditional views. Accordingly, Marcel was not baptized before reaching the age of eight, nearly two years after the death of his grandfather in 1908. Orphaned once more when his grandmother died two years later, he briefly lived with other family members before moving to Dole, a small town of the Franche-Comte region, to stay with an aunt and attend the Collège de l'Arc, where he demonstrated more ability in mathematics than in literature. His years at school there were an unpleasant experience he would never look back on fondly.

Despite ongoing issues with his health that had begun when he was a child, Aymé was able to perform his military service, which began in 1919, as part of an artillery unit in the occupied Rhineland. In 1923 he moved to Paris where he worked unsuccessfully at a bank, an insurance company, and as a journalist. Though he failed in his career as a reporter, his stint at the newspaper allowed him to discover his love of writing.

His first published novel was Brûlebois (1926), and in 1929 his La Table aux crevés won the Prix Renaudot. After the great success of his novel La Jument verte (1933), translated into English as The Green Mare, he concentrated mostly on writing and published children's stories, novels, and collections of stories. In 1935 he also started writing movie scripts. In theater, Marcel Aymé found success with his plays Lucienne et le boucher, Clérambard (1949), a farce, and Tête des autres (1952), which criticized the death penalty.

He died in 1967 and was buried in the Cimetière Saint-Vincent in the Montmartre Quarter of Paris.

Work 
One of Aymé's most famous short stories is Le passe-muraille  or "The Walker-Through-Walls". At the age of 42, Dutilleul suddenly discovers that he has "the remarkable gift of being able to pass through walls with perfect ease". What begins as a novelty that gives him pleasure ends up pushing Dutilleul toward ever more sinister pursuits.

Legacy 
Visitors to Paris can see a monument in his honor at Place Marcel-Aymé, in the Montmartre Quarter. The statue is based upon his short story "Le passe-muraille" ("The Walker through Walls").

Bibliography

Novels
1926  Brûlebois
1927  Aller Retour
1928  Les Jumeaux du diable
1929  La Table aux crevés (translated as The Hollow Field)
1930  La Rue sans nom
1931  Le Vaurien
1933  La Jument verte (translated as The Green Mare)
1935  Maison basse (translated as The House of Men)
1936  Le Moulin de la Sourdine (translated as The Secret Stream)
1937  Gustalin
1939  Le Bœuf clandestine
1941  La Belle image (variously translated as The Second Face, The Grand Seduction, and Beautiful Image)
1941  Travelingue (novel translated as The Miraculous Barber)
1943  La Vouivre (translated as The Fable and the Flesh)
1946  Le Chemin des écoliers (novel translated as The Transient Hour)
1948  Uranus (novel translated as The Barkeep of Blémont)
1960  Les Tiroirs de l'inconnu (novel translated as The Conscience of Love)

Short story collections

French
1932 Le Puits aux images (contains, in addition to the title story, "La Retraite de Russie," "Les Mauvaises Fièvres," "Noblesse," "A et B," "Pastorale," "Les Clochards," "L'Individu," "Au clair de la lune," "La Lanterne," "Enfants perdus")
1934 Le Nain (contains, in addition to the title story, "La Canne," "La Liste," "Deux victimes," "Rue Saint-Sulpice," "Bonne vie et mœurs," "L'Affaire Touffard," "Le Mariage de César," "Trois faits divers," "L'Armure," "Sporting," "La Clé sous le paillasson," "Le Dernier")
1934-1946  Les Contes du chat perché (translated as The Magic Pictures and The Wonderful Farm)
1938 Derrière chez Martin (contains "Le Romancier Martin," "Je suis renvoyé," "L'Élève Martin," "Le Temps mort," Le Cocu nombreux," "L'Âme de Martin," "Rue de l'Évangile," "Conte de Noël," "La Statue")
1943 Le Passe-muraille (contains, in addition to the title story, "Les Sabines," "La Carte," "Le Décret," "Le Proverbe," "Légende poldève," "Le Percepteur d'épouses," "Les Bottes de sept lieues," "L'Huissier," "En attendant")
1947 Le Vin de Paris (contains, in addition to the title story, "L’Indifférent," "La Traversée de Paris," "La Grâce," "Dermuche," "La Fosse aux péchés," "Le Faux Policier," "La Bonne Peinture")
1950 Les Bottes de sept lieues
1950 En arrière (contains, in addition to the title story, "Oscar et Erick," "Fiançailles," "Rechute," "Avenue Junot," "Les Chiens de notre vie," "Conte du milieu," "Josse," "La Vamp et le Normalien," "Le Mendiant")
1967 Enjambées  (first posthumous collection contains seven stories, all of which appeared earlier except for "La Fabrique")
1987 La fille du shérif

English
1958 Across Paris and Other Stories
1961 The Proverb and Other Stories (contains, in addition to the title story, "Three News Items," "Knate," "The Retreat from Moscow," "Josse," "Backwards," "The Boy Martin," "The Life-Ration," "The Bogus Policeman," "Couldn't-Care-Less," "La Bonne Peinture," "The Last")
1972 The Walker-through-walls and Other Stories
2012 The Man Who Walked through Walls (contains, in addition to the title story, "Sabine Women," "Tickets on Time," "The Problem of Summertime," "The Proverb," "Poldevian Legend," "The Wife Collector," "The Seven-League Boots," "The Bailiff," "While Waiting")

Plays
 1948 Lucienne et le boucher (Lucienne and the Butcher)
 1950 Clérambard translated by Norman Denny
 1951 Vogue la galère (adapted into a a film in 1973)
 1952 La tête des autres (Other People's Heads)
 1954 Les quatre vérités
 1954 Les sorcières de Salem (The Salem Witches, adapted from The Crucible by Arthur Miller)
 1955 Les oiseaux de lune (The Moon Birds)
 1957 La mouche bleue (The Blue Fly)
 1957 Vu du pont
 1961 Louisiane
 1961 Les Maxibules (The Maxibules)
 1963 La consommation
 1963 Le placard (The Wall Cupboard)
 1965 La nuit de l'iguane (The Night of the Iguana, adapted from The Night of the Iguana by Tennessee Williams)
 1966 La convention Belzébir (The Belzébir Convention)
 1967 Le minotaure

Screenwriter
 Crime and Punishment (dir. Pierre Chenal, 1935)
 The Green Domino (dir. Herbert Selpin and Henri Decoin, 1935)
 Les mutinés de l'Elseneur (dir. Pierre Chenal, 1936)
  (dir. Louis Daquin, 1941)
  (dir. Maurice Gleize, 1941)
 Strange Inheritance (dir. Louis Daquin, 1943)
  (dir. Louis Daquin, 1943)
 Papa, Mama, the Maid and I (dir. Jean-Paul Le Chanois, 1954)
 Papa, maman, ma femme et moi (dir. Jean-Paul Le Chanois, 1955)
 Your Money or Your Life (dir. Jean-Pierre Mocky, 1966)

Filmography
 Street Without a Name, directed by Pierre Chenal (1934, based on the novel La Rue sans nom)
 Mr. Peek-a-Boo, directed by Jean Boyer (1951, based on the short story The passer-through-walls)
 The Beautiful Image, directed by Claude Heymann (1951, based on the novel La Belle image)
 , directed by Henri Verneuil (1951, based on the novel The Hollow Field)
 La Traversée de Paris, directed by Claude Autant-Lara (1956, based on the short story Traversée de Paris)
 Way of Youth, directed by Michel Boisrond (1959, based on the novel Le Chemin des écoliers)
 The Man Who Walked Through the Wall, directed by Ladislao Vajda (West Germany, 1959, based on the short story The passer-through-walls)
 The Green Mare, directed by Claude Autant-Lara (1959, based on the novel The Green Mare)
 , directed by Philippe Agostini (1967, TV film, based on the short story La Bonne Peinture)
 , directed by Jacques Pierre (1969, TV film, based on the novel Le Boeuf clandestin)
 Clérambard, directed by Yves Robert (1969, based on the play Clérambard)
 Vogue la galère, directed by Raymond Rouleau (1973, based on the play Vogue la galère)
 , directed by Pierre Tchernia (1977, TV film, based on the short story The passer-through-walls)
 , directed by Pierre Tchernia (1979, TV film, based on the short story La Grâce)
 , directed by Georges Wilson (1989, based on the novel La Vouivre)
 Uranus, directed by Claude Berri (1990, based on the novel Uranus)
 , directed by Pierre Tchernia (1991, TV film, based on the short story L'Huissier)
 The Favour, the Watch and the Very Big Fish, directed by Ben Lewin (1991, based on the short story Rue Saint-Sulpice)

See also 

 List of French writers

References

External links 
 SAMA: Société des Amis de Marcel Aymé (in French)
 
 
 Marcel Aymé at publisher Pushkin Press
 Le roman selon les romanciers: bibliographie critique de l'Université McGill (French)  – inventory and analysis of Marcel Aymé's non-novelistic writings about the novel
 Link to several short stories by Marcel Ayme including The Man Who Could Walk Through Walls or Le Passe-Muraille
 About Marcel Aymé (fan site)

1902 births
1967 deaths
People from Joigny
French children's writers
French humorists
French fantasy writers
Writers from Bourgogne-Franche-Comté
20th-century French novelists
20th-century French male writers
French male novelists
French dramatists and playwrights
French male screenwriters
20th-century French screenwriters
People of Montmartre
Légion d'honneur refusals
Prix Blumenthal
Prix Renaudot winners